The  is a professional golf tournament on the Japan Golf Tour. It was first played in 1973 at the Takasaka Country Club (Yoneyama Course). The tournament moved to the Higashi-Matsuyama Golf Club in 1979 and to the Kawana Hotel's Fuji course in 1981. The tournament has been held at the Fujizakura Country Club in Yamanashi Prefecture since 2005. The prize fund in 2019 was ¥110,000,000, with ¥22,000,000 going to the winner. The title sponsor is the Fujisankei Communications Group.

Tournament hosts

Winners

Notes

References

External links
Coverage on Japan Golf Tour's official site
Tournament home page 

Japan Golf Tour events
Golf tournaments in Japan
Sport in Saitama Prefecture
Sport in Shizuoka Prefecture
Sport in Yamanashi Prefecture
Fujisankei Communications Group
1973 establishments in Japan
Recurring sporting events established in 1973